Fleming Summit is a peak rising to over ,  west of Mount Kirkpatrick in the Queen Alexandra Range, Antarctica. It was named by the Advisory Committee on Antarctic Names in 1995 after Thomas H. Fleming, a geologist at Ohio State University, who conducted field research in this area, 1985–86 and 1990–91.

References 

Mountains of the Ross Dependency
Shackleton Coast